Euzophera alpherakyella is a species of snout moth in the genus Euzophera. It was described by Ragonot in 1887. It is found in Russia and China.

The wingspan is 22–27 mm.

References

Moths described in 1887
Phycitini
Moths of Asia